Osseo Senior High School is a four-year public high school located in Osseo, Minnesota, United States on 317 2nd Ave. NW.
The principal is Sara Vernig. Osseo Senior High School is a part of the Osseo Area School District 279 and is one of three four-year high schools in the district.

History
Osseo Senior High was the first school to open in District 279. The original school building opened in 1928. The school was designated a high school in 1952. An auditorium/gym was added in 1935. Additional classrooms and a lunch room were added to the building in 1948. A high school addition was made to the building in 1952, and another section of the building was added in 1957. In 1959, a new gymnasium was added to the building, and in 1961, the school received a major expansion. Another wing was added to the new building in 1964, and Tech Ed. rooms were added in 1966. In 1975, voters approved a gymnasium and auditorium expansion to the building. The original 1924 building, with its 1935 and 1948 additions, was demolished to make way for the new gymnasium. The school received a library addition in 1988. In 2002, a new gym was added, the 1959 gym converted into a cafeteria, and new offices were built. From 2002-2005, the exterior of the school was renovated and air conditioning was added to the building. In 2014-2015, 6 new classrooms, weight/cardio room, and a choral rehearsal room were added to allow room for incoming 9th graders. Also multiple rooms were remodeled. At the start of the 2022-2023 school year a small asteroid landed near the school part of the debris cracked a nearby window.

Demographics
The demographic breakdown of the 1,464 students enrolled in 2015-2016 was:
Male - 53%
Female - 47%
Native American/Alaskan - 1.5%
Asian/Pacific islanders - 14%
Black - 27.5%
Hispanic - 7.%
White - 50%

41.5% of the students were eligible for free or reduced lunch.

Notable alumni
Mike Enos - Professional wrestler
Joe Jensen - Professional hockey player who played for the Carolina Hurricanes of the NHL
Trent Klatt - former NHL player who played for the Philadelphia Flyers, Minnesota North Stars, Dallas Stars, Vancouver Canucks and Los Angeles Kings
Kevin Kling - commentator for National Public Radio and acclaimed storyteller and Playwright
James Martinez - Olympic Greco-Roman Wrestling Bronze Medalist, Lightweight
Travis Morin - Professional hockey player for the Texas Stars.  Was drafted by the Washington Capitols and played for their minor league teams the South Carolina Stingrays and the Hershey Bears
Caleb Truax - Professional Boxer, IBF Super Middleweight Champion, Super Middleweight 23-1-1
Claudia Meier Volk, American politician who served in the Minnesota House of Representatives
Jake Wheatley - Pennsylvania state representative

References

External links

Public high schools in Minnesota
Educational institutions established in 1924
Schools in Hennepin County, Minnesota
1924 establishments in Minnesota